Metanilic acid is an isomer of sulfanilic acid with molecular formula  and molecular weight 173.18968 g/mol. It is a white powder that is slightly soluble in water.

See also 
 Orthanilic acid
 Sulfanilic acid

References

Benzenesulfonic acids
Anilines